The XX or simply The 20 are a fictional organization in both the XIII comic and game.

History

The XX was most likely formed by Number I with help from various other people as a patriotic militia. Sometime after its creation, they began to recruit other like-minded and politically powerful individuals and with the help of William Standwell, took control of SPADS (Special Assault and Destruction Squads) turning them into mercenaries under the employ of the Mongoose. After several years of careful planning, they decided to strike against the US Government.

Members
 Wally Sheridan - The leader of The XX 
 Calvin Wax - The Secretary of Defense
 General William Standwell - Chief of Staff of the United States Army 
 Philip Gillespie - Secretary of the Interior 
 Senator Clayton Willard - Senator 
 Judge Irving Allenby - Judge in the Sheridan Affair 
 Captain Franklin Edelbright - Commander of the USS Patriot 
 Dean Harrison - Congressman 
 Jasper Winslow - Chief executive officer of Winslow Bank
 Orville Midsummer - Proprietor of unnamed Press Groups 
 Colonel Seymour McCall - Colonel in SPADS 
 Lloyd Jennings - Advisor to the White House 
 Steve Rowland - Captain in SPADS 
 Harriet Traymore - Chief executive officer of the Federal Steel Corporation
 Jack Dickinson - Chief executive officer of the American Legion
 Colonel Norman Ryder - Colonel in the United States National Guard 
 Kim Rowland - Wife of Steve Rowland 
 Edwin Rauschenburg - Chief executive officer of CBN 
 Elly Shepherd - Director General in the United States Department of Defense 
 Eleanor Davis-Brown - United States Ambassador to the United Nations/Edward Johannsen - Director, Plain Rock Mental Institution (video game)

The Mongoose
An infamous hitman hired by The XX to carry out assassinations and other evil deeds. The Mongoose is a cruel and cold-blooded murderer who carries out his orders with eagerness and glee. He commands an army of hitmen to do some of his dirty work. He is aided by his assistant Irina Svetlanova.

References
 XIII comic/game

Fictional organizations in comics